Robin Hood is a 1991 British adventure film directed by John Irvin, executive produced by John McTiernan, and starring Patrick Bergin, Uma Thurman, Jürgen Prochnow, Jeroen Krabbé, and Edward Fox. Although originally intended for a theatrical release in the United States and South America, the film instead premiered on television, on the Fox network in those territories a month before the release of Robin Hood: Prince of Thieves. It was released in cinemas in several countries in Europe and elsewhere, including Australia, New Zealand and Japan.

Plot summary
The film begins when a miller, who is poaching deer on lands belonging to the King of England, is detected by a hunting party led by the cruel Norman knight Sir Miles Folcanet. The miller flees the hunting party until he runs into a Saxon earl, Robert Hode and his friend, Will. The miller pleads for help and Will urges Hode to intercede, as the Normans arrive threatening to poke the miller's eyes out. Folcanet is enraged by Hode's interference and demands that Hode be punished by the local Sheriff (shire-reeve) Roger Daguerre, who is Hode's friend.

Privately Daguerre confides to Hode that he needs peace with Folcanet because he has agreed to give Daguerre a large portion of his niece Marian's wealth once they are married. Publicly Daguerre orders a single stroke of the whip for Hode after he apologizes; Hode is enraged, insulting Daguerre and is outlawed as a result. He flees into Sherwood Forest, meets John Little and the usual cast of Merry Men and under the name "Robin Hood" takes up arms and fights against the Norman nobility. After seeing Hode's Merry Men humiliate Folcanet, Marian joins their band in disguise, until a disgruntled outlaw recognizes her and betrays her to the Sheriff.

Hode convinces everyone to attack Nottingham Castle to stop the wedding, certain that she loves him. Folcanet is defeated and Daguerre is convinced to set aside their feud and bless the marriage of Robin and Marian.

Cast

Production

Characterisation
The film shares some of its underlying plot with the famous 1938 swashbuckler, The Adventures of Robin Hood, concentrating on the struggle between Normans and Saxons. Details of the storyline and the identities of the characters differ widely, however, between the two versions.

Although the familiar characters Little John, Friar Tuck, Will Scarlet and Much the Miller's Son appear in this version, the traditional Sheriff of Nottingham and Guy of Gisbourne have been replaced by original antagonists. The Baron Daguerre takes the Sheriff's place as the scheming, greedy tax collector (though in this version, he is originally Robin's friend) and Folcanet stands in for Guy as the violent, vindictive knight after Robin's head (and Marian's maidenhead). Unlike many modern versions of the story, King Richard does not appear at the end and instead Daguerre is reconciled with Hode and promises a future where Saxons and Normans are treated equally.

Filming

It was filmed on location at Peckforton Castle in Cheshire, England, a medieval-style Victorian-era edifice built between 1842 and 1851. Some filming was also done near Betws-y-Coed in North Wales. Other filming locations were Beeston Castle and various locations within the Frodsham area including Heathercliffe and St Lawrence Church.

Release
20th Century Fox was originally supposed to release Robin Hood only domestically, with Carolco Pictures handling international territories. However, the deal fell through due to financial problems and as a result, Carolco called off distribution deals for the film. Fox then decided to release Robin Hood internationally as well, starting off with Japan in mid-April 1991, the UK in May and the rest of the world in June. In the United States, the film was broadcast as a three-hour-long television film on the broadcasting block Fox Night at the Movies on May 13.

References

External links
 
 
 
 

1991 films
1990s adventure drama films
1990s historical films
British historical films
Robin Hood films
British adventure drama films
Working Title Films films
Films directed by John Irvin
Films produced by Tim Bevan
Films shot in Cheshire
Films shot in Wales
1991 drama films
20th Century Fox films
1990s English-language films
1990s British films